Itzamnaaj Bʼalam was a king of Dos Pilas. His reign was short.

Family
He was the son and successor of Bʼalaj Chan Kʼawiil, and brother and predecessor of Itzamnaaj Kʼawiil. He was also a brother of Wak Chanil Ajaw and uncle of Kʼakʼ Tiliw Chan Chaak.

His mother was the Lady of Itzan.

References

Rulers of Dos Pilas